Mâaziz is a town in Khémisset Province, Rabat-Salé-Kénitra, Morocco. According to the 2004 census it has a population of 9,190.

References

Populated places in Khémisset Province
Rural communes of Rabat-Salé-Kénitra